Garegin Poghosyan is an Armenian military officer, Colonel of the Armed Forces of Armenia, Commander of the N military unit of the Ministry of Defense of the Republic of Armenia, National Hero of Armenia (2020).

Awards and honours 
On October 22, 2020, by the decree of the President of Armenia Armen Sarkissian, Colonel Poghosyan Garegin Samveli was awarded the highest title of the National Hero of Armenia.

References 

National Hero of Armenia
Year of birth missing (living people)
Living people